"Bury Me Down By the River" is a song written by Barry and Maurice Gibb and recorded separately by the Bee Gees and P.P. Arnold. The Bee Gees' version was recorded in May 1969 at IBC Studios and released in April 1970 on the album Cucumber Castle.

Brenda Patterson released a cover of the song on her self-titled album in 1973. Scottish singer Lulu recorded this song on 11 November 1970 with Tommy McClure on bass, Charlie Freeman on guitar, arranged by Arif Mardin, and was produced by Tom Dowd, mixed by Brian Kehew and Bill Inglot which was not released until 12 November 2007 when Rhino Records reissued and remastered it.

P.P. Arnold version
Arnold's version, recorded in the same studio, was released as a single on November 14, 1969 in Germany and in September elsewhere on Polydor and Atlantic Records. Its B-side was "Give a Hand, Take a Hand", also written by Barry and Maurice (the Bee Gees' would not release a version of the song until the Mr. Natural album in 1974.)  After Arnold recorded the song, she recorded the Bee Gees' 1968 song "Let There Be Love", but it was not released.

The song also featured on Arnold's compilation album Hit History.
Personnel
 P.P. Arnold — vocals
 Bill Shepherd — orchestral arrangement
 Uncredited — bass, drums, guitar, piano
 Barry Gibb — producer

Bee Gees' version

The Bee Gees' version was sung by Barry Gibb and appeared on the group's seventh album Cucumber Castle, released in April 1970. Maurice Gibb told NME that the group recorded "Bury Me Down By the River" as possibly the group's next single, but the song would instead become a single by P.P. Arnold. This track was recorded in May 1969 in IBC Studios and was produced by Robert Stigwood, Barry Gibb and Maurice Gibb. Their version was included on numerous compilations such as Stars on Top (1970). Arnold's cameo on backing vocals is a rare instance of a vocalist other than the Gibb brothers featuring on a Bee Gees record.

Personnel
 Barry Gibb — lead vocal, guitar
 Maurice Gibb — bass guitar, piano, guitar, mellotron, backing vocal
 Colin Petersen  — drums
 Peter Mason — backing vocal
 P.P. Arnold — harmony and backing vocal

References

Bee Gees songs
1970 songs
Songs written by Barry Gibb
Songs written by Maurice Gibb
Song recordings produced by Robert Stigwood
Song recordings produced by Barry Gibb
Song recordings produced by Maurice Gibb
1970 singles
Polydor Records singles
Atlantic Records singles